Joel Bejarano Azogue (born March 21, 1996 in Santa Cruz de la Sierra) is a Bolivian  footballer who currently plays as a midfielder.

Club career statistics

International career
Bejarano was a member of the Bolivian squad that participated in the 2013 South American Under-17 Football Championship. He was also summoned to the Bolivian U-20 team to play in the 2015 South American Youth Football Championship.

References

External links
 

1996 births
Living people
Sportspeople from Santa Cruz de la Sierra
Association football midfielders
Bolivian footballers
Club Blooming players
Oriente Petrolero players
Bolivia youth international footballers